The 1928 Michigan gubernatorial election was held on November 6, 1928. Incumbent Republican Fred W. Green defeated Democratic nominee William Comstock with 69.94% of the vote.

General election

Candidates
Major party candidates
Fred W. Green, Republican
William Comstock, Democratic 
Other candidates
Guy H. Lockwood, Socialist
Ervin D. Brooks, Prohibition
William Reynolds, Communist
Paul Dinger, Socialist Labor

Results

References

1928
Michigan
Gubernatorial
November 1928 events in the United States